Otto Becker (born 3 December 1958 in Großostheim) is a former German show jumping champion, Olympic champion from 2000. Since January 2009 he is the coach of the German show jumping team.

Olympic Record
Becker participated at the 2000 Summer Olympics in Sydney, where he won a gold medal in team show jumping, together with Lars Nieberg, Marcus Ehning and Ludger Beerbaum. He received a bronze medal in team show jumping in 2004.

References

1958 births
Living people
Olympic gold medalists for Germany
Equestrians at the 1992 Summer Olympics
Equestrians at the 2000 Summer Olympics
Equestrians at the 2004 Summer Olympics
Olympic equestrians of Germany
German male equestrians
Olympic medalists in equestrian
Medalists at the 2004 Summer Olympics
Medalists at the 2000 Summer Olympics
Olympic bronze medalists for Germany
People from Aschaffenburg (district)
Sportspeople from Lower Franconia